The 1896 American Cup was the twelfth edition of the soccer tournament organized by the American Football Association. The 1894 Runners Up, Paterson True Blues, won the tournament after defeating the two-time champions Fall River Olympics in the final. This season the elected committee was James C. Potter of Pawtucket as president, James Turner of Paterson as vice president, William Robertson of Newark as Secretary, and Andrew Meiklejohn of Pawtucket as Treasurer.

Participants

Western Clubs:
 Scottish-AmericanNewark, New Jersey (NAFBL)
 CaledonianKearny, New Jersey
 RangersKearny, New Jersey
 ThistleNew York (NAFBL)
 International A.C.New York (NAFBL)
 ThistlePaterson, New Jersey
 True BluesPaterson, New Jersey

Eastern Clubs:
 East EndsFall River, Massachusetts (NEL)
 OlympicsFall River, Massachusetts (NEL)
 RoversFall River, Massachusetts (NEL)
 Free WanderersPawtucket, Rhode Island (NEL)
 Young Men's Christian AssociationPawtucket, Rhode Island (NEL)
 TaftvilleTaftville, Connecticut

First round
The first round draw took place at the AFA meeting at Newark, New Jersey on September 21, 1895. The True Blues had a bye. The Rover-East End match was ordered replayed because of unregistered players and it was played with 30 minute halves.

Caledonians: GK J.Hopkins, FB G.Winters, W.Mortimer, HB R.Swithemby, J.McCance, A.Cutler, FW P.Cooper, R.Taylor, J.Nagle, D.Douglas, H.Singleton.

Olympics: GK Irving, FB Fortin, Lagrosse, HB Hayes, Drouge, Jean, RW Miller, Demille, LW Borden, Sunderland, C P.Farrell. Reserves Bright, Leveque. Taftville: G J.Brown, FB Gamble, Catterall, HB Baldwin, Wood, Ferguson, RW Smith, Montgomery, LW Nelson, Muttlewain, C W.Brown.

Rovers: GK Simister, FB Fagin, Harry Adams, HB Hancock, Robert Pickup, J.Stanton, RW Lord, Tobin, LW Savaugh, Gigerette, C Cummings. East Ends: GK Brady, FB Jennings, S.Jenkins, HB Lonsdale, Pat Stanton, Beattie, RW Colligan, Pearson, LW Sullivan, Murphy, C Tom Stanton.

Free Wanderers: GK Hanaway, FB T.Davis, Whipple, HB Walmsley, Read, Adams, RW Hutchinson, Richard Davis, LW Hunt, James, C Lyons. Y.M.C.A.: GK McFarlane, FB F.Watson, Paterson, HB Schora, Meiklejohn, McLay, RW Wilde, McNeil, LW Malone, Moore, C A.Watson.

replays 

Free Wanderers: GK Hanaway, FB Walmsley, Whipple, HB Hunt, Read, Adams, RW Hutchinson, Smith, LW Davis, James, C Kirkham. Y.M.C.A.: GK McFarlane, FB F.Watson, Paterson, HB Schora, Meiklejohn, McLay, RW Wilde, McNeil, LW Malone, Morrison, C A.Watson.

Rovers: GK Dennis Shea, FB Fagan, Hancock, HB Eccles, Pickup, J.Stanton, LW Hughes, Bannister, RW Lord, Melia, C Giguerette. East Ends: GK Brady, FB Jennings, S.Jenkins, HB Burns, Pat Stanton, John Haywood, LW Murphy, Smith, RW Hargraves, Culligan, C Tom Stanton.

Rovers: GK Dennis Shea, FB Ormonde, Murphy, HB Eccles, Pickup, J.Stanton, LW Hancock, Tobin, RW Lord, Simister, C Pemberton. East Ends: GK Brady, FB Jennings, S.Jenkins, HB Beattie, Pat Stanton, John Heywood, LW Pearson, Green, RW Culligan, Greenwood, C Tom Stanton.

Second round
The Rovers drew a second round bye. The True Blue-Caledonian match was protested and ordered replayed.

Olympics: GK Irving, FB Fortin, Legrosse, HB Hayes, Drouge, Jean, RW Miller, Demille, LW Borden, Sunderland, C P.Farrell. Reserves W.Blake, O.H.Bennett, I.Greenwood. Free Wanderers: GK Hanaway, FB T.Davis, Whipple, HB Walmsley, Read, Adams, RW Hutchinson, Hunt, LW R.Davis, James, C Jenkins.

International: GK Hayes, FB R.Sanson, Allen, HB Slack, Partington, Cutler, LW Hood, Douglass, C H.Sanson, RW Marshall, McGee. Rangers: GK Dunning, FB Flynn, Holmes, HB Kimberlin, Taylor, Stubbs, LW Murphy, Stubbs, C Jamieson, RW Jones, Higgins.

True Blues: GK Fred Allen, FB W.Alexander, H.McCrowe, HB R.Hall, G.Eaton, J.Upton, FW E.Grewcock, J.O'Neil, Robert Spencer, Harry Lander, Tommie Turner. Caledonians: GK Glynn, FB McCance, Dave Wilson, HB Swithemby, Morton, Singleton, FW Kelly, Philbin, Nagle, Burns, Brown.

replay 

True Blues: GK Fred Allen, FB W.Alexander, H.McCrowe, HB R.Hall, G.Eaton, J.Upton, FW E.Grewcock, J.Oldfield, Robert Spencer, Harry Lander, Tommie Turner. Caledonians: GK Wilkie, FB J.Wilson, W.Mortimer, HB J.McCance, W.Morton, H.Singleton, FW P.Cooper, G.Govern, J.Nagle, A.Burns, J.Kerr.

Semifinals 

True Blues: GK Fred Allen, FB W.Alexander, H.McCrowe, HB R.Hall, G.Eaton, J.Upton, RW E.Grewcock(c), J.Oldfield, C Robert Spencer, LW Harry Lauder, Tommie Turner. International: GK Hopkins, FB Walker, Patrick, HB R.Taylor, Stubbs, Jones, LW Grundy, Saulter, C Young, RW J.Taylor, O'Donnell.

Olympics: GK Irving, FB Fortin, Legrosse, HB Hayes, Drouge, Jean, RW Miller, Demille, LW Borden, Sunderland, C P.Farrell.  Rovers: GK Simister, FB Cunliffe, Hughes, HB Hancock, Pickup, J.Stanton, LW Bannister, M.Harrington, RW Lord, J.Farrell, C Pemberton.

Final 
The Olympics entered the final undefeated in all competitions up to that point with 68 goals scored to 10 against. They won the New England League as well as the Mayor's Cup series. The True Blues had only two losses in 21 games scoring 103 goals to 26 against. 

True Blues: GK J.McKay, FB W.Alexander, R.Watson, HB R.Hall, George Eaton, J.Upton, RW E.Grewcock(c), James Oldfield, C Robert Spencer, LW Harry Lauder, Thomas Turner. Olympics: GK James Irving, FB Peter C. Fortin, Joseph Legrosse, HB Timothy Hayes, Francis Drouge, Frederick Jean, RW William Miller, Joseph Demille, LW Ernest Borden, John Sunderland, C Patrick Farrell.

Champions 

Standing: Thomas Petty (Trainer), R. Hall, W. Alexander, George Eaton, J. McKay, J. Upton, R. Watson, Herbert Newton (Manager), H. Hill (Trainer).Kneeling: James Oldfield, E. Grewcock (Captain), Robert Spencer, Harry W. Lauder, Thomas Turner.

References 

1896